The Russian reset was an attempt by the Obama administration to improve relations between the United States and Russia in 2009–2013.

Symbolic reset
On 6 March 2009 in Geneva, U.S. Secretary of State Hillary Clinton presented Russian Foreign Minister Sergey Lavrov with a red button with the English word "reset" and the Roman alphabet transliteration of the Russian Cyrillic alphabet word перегрузка ("peregruzka"). It was intended that this would be the Russian word for "reset" but actually was the word for "overload". (The correct translation would be перезагрузка ["perezagruzka"].) Additionally, the button switch was the type commonly used as an emergency stop on industrial equipment. Hillary Clinton was later praised by the Russian diplomats for resolving the issue politely, stating her team's good intentions. Lavrov and Clinton pushed the button simultaneously.

Substantive reset

Prior to the reset, U.S.-Russia relations had been hurt by the 2008 Russo-Georgian diplomatic crisis in Ossetia and the Russo-Georgian War, leading to Immediate Response 2008 by the Bush Administration. In private, several Obama administration officials expressed doubts about the reset and were concerned that it was overly optimistic, particularly Secretary of State Hillary Clinton, Secretary of Defense Robert Gates and U.S. ambassador to Russia John Beyrle.

In July 2009, Russian president Dmitry Medvedev announced that U.S. forces and supplies could pass through Russian airspace on their way to Afghanistan. On 17 September 2009, U.S. President Barack Obama announced that the U.S. was dropping the Bush Administration's plan to build a missile defense shield in Eastern Europe. Russia had viewed the planned missile shield as a military threat. Vladimir Putin said the decision was "correct and brave". In March, 2010, the U.S. and Russia agreed to reduce their nuclear arsenals.

In May 2010, major powers including the U.S., China, and Russia agreed on sanctions against Iran. Three days later, the Obama Administration cancelled sanctions against the Russian state arms export agency, which had been sanctioned for exporting arms to Iran.

In response to the adoption of the Magnitsky Act in 2012, the Russian government prohibited the Americans to adopt Russian children and issued a list of U.S. officials barred from entering Russia.

At the 2015 Munich Security Conference, Vice President Biden specified the substantive progress, and setbacks:

Subsequent deterioration of relations
As early as the March 2014 censure of Russia by the United Nations over the Russian annexation of Crimea, the reset was described in the press as "failed". Stated reasons included the annexation, the 2014 pro-Russian unrest in Ukraine, and lack of Russian cooperation with the U.S. on Syria. Former Polish Minister of Foreign Affairs Adam Rotfeld stated that the reset showed "weakness". Jeb Bush also called the reset a failure, stating that Russia had "invaded Ukraine", which Russia had not done prior to the reset. He added that Putin was a "bully" and that "nuanced" behavior by the U.S. towards Putin tended to "enable bad behavior." Lithuanian President Dalia Grybauskaitė in 2010 refused to go to Prague to meet with President Obama in protest of the reset.

However, Hillary Clinton defended the reset as a "brilliant stroke", pointing to the Russian agreement to sanctions against Iran and permission to fly over its territory to supply joint NATO troops in Afghanistan.

In October 2014, Medvedev said that a reset of relations with the U.S. was "impossible" and that relations had been damaged by "destructive" and "stupid" Western sanctions against Russia. The sanctions had been imposed because of the Ukraine crisis and the shooting down of Malaysia Airlines Flight 17, which Western powers said was the result of a missile fired from Russian-controlled territory.

In April 2015, CNN reported that "Russian hackers had penetrated sensitive parts of the White House computers in recent months." It was said that the FBI, the Secret Service, and other U.S. intelligence agencies categorized the attacks as "among the most sophisticated attacks ever launched against U.S. government systems."

In April 2016, two Russian jets flew over the U.S. destroyer USS Donald Cook almost a dozen times, American officials said. At one point the jets were so close – about 9 m (30 ft) – that they created wakes in the water around the ship. The jets had no visible weaponry and the ship took no action.

This sharp decline in relations has been termed Cold War II by some.

References

Russia–United States relations
Presidency of Barack Obama